Kevin Juhl Pedersen (born 5 September 2001) is a Danish speedway rider.

Speedway career 
Juhl Pedersen came to prominence in 2022, when he won two silver medals at the Danish Under 21 Individual Speedway Championship and the 2022 Team Speedway Junior European Championship. He also finished 6th in the World U21 final at the 2022 SGP2 and 5th at the World U21 Team Championships at the 2022 Speedway of Nations 2.

During 2022, he rode for club speedway for Lokomotiv Daugavpils in Poland and Rospiggarna in Sweden and Grindsted in Denmark.

References 

2001 births
Living people
Danish speedway riders